Regular Guys is a 1996 German comedy film directed by Rolf Silber.

Cast 
 Christoph M. Ohrt - Christoph Schwenk
 Carin C. Tietze - Helen
 Tim Bergmann - Edgar
 Oliver Stokowski - Mike
 Rudolf Kowalski - Kallenbach
 Dieter Brandecker - Deichsel
 Daniela Ziegler - Iris
 Ina Weisse - Karin
 Andreas Pietschmann - Marco

References

External links

1996 films
1996 comedy films
LGBT-related comedy films
German LGBT-related films
1996 LGBT-related films
1990s German films